Leon Hellmuth (14 August 1934 – 29 December 1981) was an English cricketer who played first-class cricket for Kent County Cricket Club in 1951 and 1952. He was born at Blackheath, London in 1934.

Hellmuth, who was described by The Times in 1952 as "a batsman of undoubted promise", made his first-class debut for Kent against Essex in the 1951 County Championship at Blackheath. He made a total of seven First XI appearances for the county, all of which came, other than his debut, in 1952, with his final first-class match being against Leicestershire. Hellmuth played 34 matches for the Kent Second XI in the Minor Counties Championship between 1951 and 1955.

He died at Sidcup in the London Borough of Bexley in December 1981 aged 47.

References

External links

1934 births
1981 deaths
People from Blackheath, London
English cricketers
Kent cricketers